Duncan Henry Wilson  is the chief executive of Historic England.

He was formerly Chief Executive of Alexandra Palace and Park and the first Director of the Somerset House Trust. He also oversaw the conversion of the Old Royal Naval College into a tourist destination.

He is a trustee of the Churches Conservation Trust (2008-) and has been a trustee of the Royal Armouries (2007-2011) and before that a community governor of Corelli College (2004-2007).

References

British chief executives
Living people
Year of birth missing (living people)
Members of the Order of the British Empire
Historic England